Potassium voltage-gated channel subfamily A member 1 also known as Kv1.1 is a shaker related voltage-gated potassium channel that in humans is encoded by the KCNA1 gene. Isaacs syndrome is a result of an autoimmune reaction against the Kv1.1 ion channel.

Genomics 

The gene is located on the Watson (plus) strand of the short arm of chromosome 12 (12p13.32). The gene itself is 8,348 bases in length and encodes a protein of 495 amino acids (predicted molecular weight 56.466 kiloDaltons).

Alternative names 

The recommended name for this protein is potassium voltage-gated channel subfamily A member 1 but a number of alternatives have been used in the literature including HuK1 (human K+ channel I), RBK1 (rubidium potassium channel 1), MBK (mouse brain K+ channel), voltage gated potassium channel HBK1, voltage gated potassium channel subunit Kv1.1, voltage-gated K+ channel HuKI and AEMK (associated with myokymia with periodic ataxia).

Structure 

The protein is believed to have six domains (S1-S6) with the loop between S5 and S6 forming the channel pore. This region also has a conserved selectivity filter motif. The functional channel is a homotetramer. The N-terminus of the protein associates with β subunits. These subunits regulate channel inactivation as well as its expression. The C-terminus is associated with a PDZ domain protein involved in channel targeting.

Function 

The protein functions as a potassium selective channel through which the potassium ion may pass in consensus with the electrochemical gradient. They play a role in repolarisation of membranes.

RNA editing 

The pre-mRNA of this protein is subject to RNA editing.

Type 

A to I RNA editing is catalyzed by a family of adenosine deaminases acting on RNA (ADARs) that specifically recognize adenosines within double-stranded regions of pre-mRNAs (e.g. Potassium channel RNA editing signal) and deaminate them to inosine. Inosines are recognised as guanosine by the cells translational machinery. There are three members of the ADAR family ADARs 1-3 with ADAR1  and ADAR2 being the only enzymatically active members. ADAR3 is thought to have a regulatory role in the brain. ADAR1 and ADAR2 are widely expressed in tissues while ADAR3 is restricted to the brain. The double stranded regions of RNA are formed by base-pairing between residues in the region close to the editing site with residues usually in a neighboring intron but can sometimes be an exonic sequence too. The region that base pairs with the editing region is known as an Editing Complementary Sequence (ECS).

Location 

The modified residue is found at amino acid 400 of the final protein. This is located in the sixth transmembrane region found, which corresponds to the inner vestibule of the pore. A stem loop hairpin structure mediates the RNA editing. ADAR2 is likely to be the preferred editing enzyme at the I/V site. Editing results in a codon alteration from ATT to GTT, resulting in an amino acid change from isoleucine to valine. ADAR2 enzyme is the major editing enzyme. The MFOLD programme predicted that the minimum region required for editing would form an imperfect inverted repeat hairpin. This region is composed of a 114 base pairs. Similar regions have been identified in mouse and rat. The edited adenosine is found in a 6-base pair duplex region. Mutation experiment in the region near the 6-base pair duplex have shown that the specific bases in this region were also essential for editing to occur. The region required for editing is unusual in that the hairpin structure is formed by exonic sequences only. In the majority of A to I editing the ECS is found within an intronic sequence.

Conservation 
The editing is highly conserved having been observed in squid, fruit fly, mouse, and rat.

Regulation 
Editing levels vary in different tissues: 17% in the caudate nucleus, 68% in the spinal cord, and 77% in the medulla.

Consequences

Structure 

Editing results in a codon (I/V) change from (ATT) to (GTT) resulting in translation of a valine instead of an isoleucine at the position of the editing site. Valine has a larger side-chain. RNA editing at this position occurs at a highly conserved ion conducting pore of the channel.  This may affect the channels role in the process of fast inactivation.

Function 

Voltage-dependent potassium channels modulate excitability by opening and closing a potassium selective pore in response to voltage. The flow of potassium ions is interrupted by interaction of an inactivating particle, an auxiliary protein in humans but an intrinsic part of the channel in other species. The I to V amino acid change is thought to disrupt the hydrophobic interaction between the inactivating particle and the pore lining. This interrupts the process of fast inactivation. Activation kinetics are unaffected by RNA editing. Changes in inactivation kinetics affect the duration and frequency of the action potential. An edited channel passes more current and has a shorter action potential than the non-edited type due to the inability of the inactivating particle to interact with the residue in the ion-conducting pore of the channel. This was determined by electrophysiology analysis. The length of time the membrane is depolarised is decreased, which also reduces the efficiency of transmitter release. Since editing can cause amino acid changes in 1- 4 in potassium channel tetramers, it can have a wide variety of effects on channel inactivation.

Dysregulation 

Changes in the process of fast inactivation are known to have behavioral and neurological consequences in vivo.

Clinical 

Mutations in this gene cause episodic ataxia type 1.

See also 
GABRA3 - a channel subunit which undergoes similar RNA editing

References

Further reading

External links 
  GeneReviews/NCBI/NIH/UW entry on Episodic Ataxia Type 1, Episodic Ataxia with Myokymia, Hereditary Cerebellar Ataxia with Neuromyotonia
 
 

Ion channels